is a Japanese voice actress and singer affiliated with E-Stone Music. She started her career after passing an audition for the role of Freyja Wion in the 2016 anime television series Macross Delta, beating 8,000 other auditionees for the role.

Biography

Career
Suzuki loved singing ever since she was a child, and held an interest in voice-related work (such as singing, narration, and acting). In her elementary school years, she began to watch late night anime, which inspired her to become a voice actor in order to do all the things she wanted to do. After saving up money working part-time in her first year of high school, she began to take lessons at a voice acting school in Tokyo once a week. In October 2014, the creators of the Macross franchise announced that auditions were going to be held, with the winner being cast in a role in the upcoming anime television series Macross Delta. Her mother was a fan of Macross Frontier, and knowing Suzuki's dream of becoming involved in entertainment, pushed her to participate in the audition. Having been inspired to participate in the audition due to her idolizing Megumi Nakajima, voice actress of Macross Frontiers Ranka Lee, Suzuki auditioned for the Macross Delta role, and in 2015 was selected for the role from a pool of approximately 8,000 other applicants. She was cast as Freyja Wion, the lead female character in the series, and a member of the fictional idol group Walküre.

For Danganronpa V3: Killing Harmony, She voiced as the Ultimate Artist, Angie Yonaga; a peppy, quirky, heavily religious and spiritual girl, believing that Atua is always at her side.

Walküre's first single, which includes the series' opening theme  and ending theme , as well as the song , was released on May 11, 2016.

In July 2017, Suzuki and Macross Delta co-star JUNNA were guests at Anime Expo in Los Angeles.

She made her solo debut in 2018 when she performed the opening theme to the anime television series Ms. Koizumi Loves Ramen Noodles.

For Cardcaptor Sakura: Clear Card, Minori voiced as Akiho Shinomoto.

In late January 20, 2020, Minori made her YouTube debut to promote one of her singles "Yozora" for the anime Koisuru Asteroid.

Personal life
Suzuki lists Maaya Sakamoto, Megumi Nakajima, Nagi Yanagi and Galileo Galilei as among her influences in voice acting and music. Suzuki was fond of Nakajima in particular, once having participated in one of the latter's handshake events.

Filmography

Anime

Video games

Discography

Studio albums

Singles

References

External links 
 Official website 
 Minori Suzuki at Oricon 
 

1997 births
Living people
Japanese video game actresses
Japanese voice actresses
Voice actresses from Aichi Prefecture
Music YouTubers
21st-century Japanese actresses
21st-century Japanese singers
21st-century Japanese women singers
Japanese YouTubers